FHN may refer to:

Fiberhome Networks
First Horizon National Corporation
FitzHugh–Nagumo model

 Forest Hills Northern High School